Charles Wolf Jr. (August 1, 1924 – October 24, 2016) was a senior economic advisor at the RAND Corporation (June 23, 1955 – October 24, 2016). He was also a senior research fellow at the Hoover Institution at Stanford University and was on the advisory board of the Center for International Business and Economic Research at the UCLA Anderson School of Management. He was a board member of Capital Income Builder and of Capital World Growth and Income, Inc., and a member of the American Economic Association, the Econometric Society, the Council on Foreign Relations, and the International Institute for Strategic Studies in London. He is noted for predicting the economic collapse of the Soviet Union in the 1980s.

Wolf’s research focused on how economic forces shape the international political environment and how economic instruments can advance U.S. and Western interests. This way of thinking has been a complement to the political and military analyses that typically dominate these discussions. His research also contributed to the respective competencies of market forces and governments.

Career
Wolf served as a Foreign Service Officer with the United States Department of State (1945–1947, 1949–1953). In the early 1950s, he was a visiting professor of economics and Asian studies at Cornell University and an assistant professor of economics and Far East studies at the University of California, Berkeley. He joined the RAND Corporation in 1955 and headed the Economics Department from 1967 to 1981. In 1965 his name appeared on a list of academics involved with Project Camelot. He served as founding dean of the Frederick S. Pardee RAND Graduate School from 1970 to 1997; he taught at the school until his death. He died after going into cardiac arrest on October 24, 2016 at the Ronald Reagan UCLA Medical Center in Los Angeles.

Awards
In 2007, Wolf received the Order of the Rising Sun, Gold Rays with Neck Ribbon, from the government of Japan. He was recognized for helping to nurture U.S. public opinion that was favorable to Japan.

Education
Wolf received BS, Masters, and PhD degrees in economics from Harvard University.BS was earned before service in WW II, the latter two degrees after his foreign service immediately after the War in the Pacific.

Selected publications
Wolf, Charles, Jr., Economic Development and Mutual Security: Some Problems of U.S. Foreign Assistance Programs in Southeast Asia, RAND Corporation, RM-1778-RC, 1956  https://www.rand.org/pubs/research_memoranda/RM1778.html
Wolf, Charles, Jr., Foreign Aid: Theory and Practice in Southern Asia, Princeton University Press, 1960 
Wolf, Charles, Jr., Insurgency and Counterinsurgency: New Myths and Old Realities, RAND Corporation, P-3132-1, 1965 https://www.rand.org/pubs/papers/P3132-1.html
Leites, Nathan, and Charles Wolf, Jr., Rebellion and Authority: Myths and Realities Reconsidered, RAND Corporation, P-3422, 1966 https://www.rand.org/pubs/papers/P3422.html
Leites, Nathan, and Charles Wolf, Jr., Rebellion and Authority: An Analytic Essay on Insurgent Conflicts, RAND Corporation, R-462-ARPA, 1970 https://www.rand.org/pubs/reports/R0462.html Also published by Markham Publishing Company, Chicago, 1970
Wolf, Charles, Jr., Marilee Lawrence, Aaron S. Gurwitz, Edmund D. Brunner, K.C. Yeh, The Costs of the Soviet Empire, RAND Corporation, R-3073/1-NA, 1983 https://www.rand.org/pubs/reports/R3073z1.html
Wolf, Charles, Jr., Don Henry, K.C. Yeh, James H. Hayes, John F. Schank, Richard L. Sneider, The Changing Balance: South and North Korean Capabilities for Long-Term Military Competition, RAND Corporation, R-3305/1-NA, 1985 https://www.rand.org/pubs/reports/R3305z1.html
Wolf, Charles, Jr., The Rise of Market Forces, RAND Corporation, N-2761-RC, 1988 https://www.rand.org/pubs/notes/N2761.html
Wolf, Charles, Jr., and Benjamin Zycher, Military Dimensions of Communist Systems: Findings and Implications, RAND Corporation, R-3629-USDP, 1989 https://www.rand.org/pubs/reports/R3629.html
Wolf, Charles, Jr., Benjamin Zycher, Heide Phillips Shockley, and Jeannette Van Winkle, Gorbachev's Allocative Choices: Constraints, Dilemmas, and Policy Directions, RAND Corporation, R-3891-USDP, 1990 https://www.rand.org/pubs/reports/R3891.html
Wolf, Charles, Jr., Linking Economic Policy and Foreign Policy, Transaction Publishers, 1991
Wolf, Charles, Jr., Economic Pivot in a Political Context, Transaction Publishers, 1991
Wolf, Charles, Jr., Promoting Democracy and Free Markets in Eastern Europe, RAND Corporation, R-4115-AID, 1991 https://www.rand.org/pubs/reports/R4115.html
Wolf, Charles, Jr., Kwan-chi Oh, James H. Hayes, Norman D. Levin, Yong-Sup Han, Korean and U.S. Forces and Responsibilities in the Changing Asian Security Environment: Executive Summary, RAND Corporation, R-4095-NA/USDP, 1991 https://www.rand.org/pubs/reports/R4095.html
Wolf, Charles, Jr., Don Henry, Charles Robert Roll, Jr., K.C. Yeh, Market-Oriented Policies for the Development of Hainan: Executive Summary, RAND Corporation, R-4060-NRCSTD, 1992 https://www.rand.org/pubs/reports/R4060.html
Wolf, Charles, Jr., Markets or Governments: Choosing Between Imperfect Alternatives, MIT Press, 1993
Wolf, Charles, Jr., King Mallory, Aiding Russia and Ukraine, RAND Corporation, IP-135, 1993 https://www.rand.org/pubs/issue_papers/IP135.html
Wolf, Charles, Jr., Developing Improved Deflators for Defense Research and Development, RAND Corporation, MR-165-ACQ, 1993 https://www.rand.org/pubs/monograph_reports/MR165.html
Neu, C. Richard and Charles Wolf, Jr., The Economic Dimensions of National Security, RAND Corporation, R-466-OSD, 1994 https://www.rand.org/pubs/monograph_reports/MR466.html
Wolf, Charles, Jr., K.C. Yeh, Anil Bamezai, Don Henry, Michael Kennedy, Long-Term Economic and Military Trends 1994-2015: The United States and Asia, RAND Corporation, MR-627-OSD, 1995 https://www.rand.org/pubs/monograph_reports/MR627.html
Wolf, Charles, Jr., Asian Economic Trends and Their Security Implications, RAND Corporation, MR-1143-OSD/A, 2000 https://www.rand.org/pubs/monograph_reports/MR1143.html
Wolf, Charles, Jr. and Benjamin Zycher, European Military Prospects, Economic Constraints, and the Rapid Reaction Force, RAND Corporation, MR-1416-OSD/SRF, 2001 https://www.rand.org/pubs/monograph_reports/MR1416.html
Chen, Shuxun and Charles Wolf, Jr., China, the United States, and the Global Economy, RAND Corporation, R-1300-RC, 2001 https://www.rand.org/pubs/monograph_reports/MR1300.html
Wolf, Charles, Jr., Straddling Economics and Politics: Cross-Cutting Issues in Asia, the United States, and the Global Economy, RAND Corporation, MR-1571-RC, 2002 https://www.rand.org/pubs/monograph_reports/MR1571.html
Wolf, Charles, Jr., K.C. Yeh, Benjamin Zycher, Nicholas Eberstadt, Sungho Lee, Fault Lines in China’s Economic Terrain, RAND Corporation, MR-1686-NA/SRF, 2003 https://www.rand.org/pubs/monograph_reports/MR1686.html
Wolf, Charles, Jr. and Brian Rosen, Public Diplomacy: How to Think About and Improve It, RAND Corporation, OP-134, 2004 https://www.rand.org/pubs/occasional_papers/OP134.html
Wolf, Charles, Jr., Kamiljon t. Akramov, North Korean Paradoxes: Circumstances, Costs, and Consequences of Korean Unification, RAND Corporation, MG-333-OSD, 2005 https://www.rand.org/pubs/monographs/MG333.html
Wolf, Charles, Jr. and Thomas Lang, Russia’s Economy: Signs of Progress and Retreat on the Transitional Road, RAND Corporation, MG-515-OSD, 2006 https://www.rand.org/pubs/monographs/MG515.html
Wolf, Charles, Jr., Looking Backward and Forward: Policy Issues in the Twenty-first Century, Stanford Calif: Hoover Institute Press, 2008
Wolf, Charles, Jr. and Norman D. Levin, Modernizing the North Korean System: Objectives, Method, and Application, RAND Corporation, MG-710-SRF/MCF/RC, 2008 https://www.rand.org/pubs/monographs/MG710.html
Wolf, Charles, Jr., Brian G. Chow, Gregory S. Jones, Enhancement by Enlargement: The Proliferation Security Initiative, RAND Corporation, MG-806-OSD, 2008 https://www.rand.org/pubs/monographs/MG806.html
Green, Jerrold D., Frederic Wehrey, Charles Wolf, Jr., Understanding Iran, RAND Corporation, MG-771-SRF, 2009 https://www.rand.org/pubs/monographs/MG771.html
Wolf, Charles, Jr., Siddhartha Dalal, Julie DaVanzo, Eric V. Larson, Alisher Akhmedjonov, Harun Dogo, Meilinida Huang, Silvia Montoya, China and India, 2025: A Comparative Assessment, RAND Corporation, MG-1009-OSD, 2011 https://www.rand.org/pubs/monographs/MG1009.html
Wolf, Charles, Jr., Brian G. Chow, Gregory S. Jones, Scott Warren Harold, China's Expanding Role in Global Mergers and Acquisitions Markets, RAND Corporation, MG-1162-CAPP, 2011 https://www.rand.org/pubs/monographs/MG1162.html
Wolf, Charles, Jr., Xiao Wang, Eric Warner, China's Foreign Aid and Government-Sponsored Investment Activities: Scale, Content, Destinations, and Implications, RAND Corporation, RR-118, 2013 https://www.rand.org/pubs/research_reports/RR118.html
Wolf, Charles, Jr., Puzzles, Paradoxes, Controversies, and the Global Economy, Hoover Institution Press, 2015

References

1924 births
2016 deaths
People from Forest Hills, Queens
Harvard College alumni
Recipients of the Order of the Rising Sun, 3rd class
RAND Corporation people
Economists from New York (state)
Project Camelot
Harvard Graduate School of Arts and Sciences alumni